The men's team sprint race of the 2015–16 ISU Speed Skating World Cup 1, arranged in the Olympic Oval, in Calgary, Alberta, Canada, will be held on 14 November 2015.

The Dutch team won the race, while the American team came second, and the Russian team came third. As this was the first time the event was skated as an official ISU competition, the winning time automatically became the world record. The rest of the results became national records.

Results
The race will take place on Saturday, 14 November, in the afternoon session, scheduled at 15:54.

Note: WR = world record, NR = national record.

References

Men team sprint
1